Augustinianum is a biannual peer-reviewed academic journal covering the study of the Fathers of the Church. Since 1961 the journal has published over 3,800 articles and reviews in this field. The journal is edited by Antonio Gaytán and published by the Patristic Institute Augustinianum (Rome). Online access to all issues is provided by the Philosophy Documentation Center.

Abstracting and indexing
The journal is abstracted and indexed in L'Année philologique, Atla Religion Database, International Bibliography of Periodical Literature, MLA International Bibliography, Old Testament Abstracts, and ProQuest databases.

See also
List of theology journals

References

External links

Biannual journals
Multilingual journals
Christianity studies journals
Publications established in 1961
Patristic journals
Philosophy Documentation Center academic journals
Augustine studies